Dullah is a village and union council of Chakwal District in the Punjab Province of Pakistan. Dullah is a very famous place of the Chakwaal District. Sardar Abdullah Khan Karlal came here in the 18th century.   
Latitude. 33.1588889°, Longitude. 72.6919444°,

References

Union councils of Chakwal District
Populated places in Chakwal District